Thomas Harrison ( 31 January 1866 – 1942) was an English footballer who played in The Football League for Aston Villa.

Harrison signed, age 21, for Coombs Wood F.C.. There is a modern Coombs Wood F.C. club but there is no data about a Coombs Wood F.C. in the 1880's.

Thomas Harrison made his only League appearance in 1888–1889, the inaugural Football league season. He played left-wing for Villa at Trent Bridge, then home of Notts County. Villa won 4–2 on 8 December 1888.

References

1866 births
1942 deaths
Footballers from Birmingham, West Midlands
Association football wingers
English footballers
Coombs Wood F.C. players
Aston Villa F.C. players
Halesowen Town F.C. players
English Football League players